Weininger is a German surname. Notable people with the surname include:

 Chad Weininger (born 1972), American business owner and politician
 David Weininger (1952–2016), American chemist and entrepreneur
 Otto Weininger (1880–1903), Austrian philosopher

German-language surnames
Jewish surnames